Piotr Jerzy Naszarkowski (born 1952) is a Polish engraver. He has been living in Sweden since 1989. He has engraved on many supports : book illustrations, banknotes, postage stamps, etc.

Born in 1952 in Warsaw, Poland, he graduated in 1980 from the Fine Art school of Warsaw. From 1978 to 1980, he worked as stage designer for the Guliwer puppet theatre. He entered 1980 the Polish television. He quit it next year with another artists to protest the proclamation of the martial law after Solidarność union's strike.

Naszarkowski found a place at the Polish Banknote Printing House where he was taught the art of engraving on copper and steel. He became well-known when his ex-libris Lucas Cranach was printed in Belgium.

His first engraved postage stamp is issued in 1985. His 99th and 100th stamps were issued September 2005 for the Greta Garbo joint issue between Sweden and the United States.

External links
 Personal site of the artist (English, polish and Swedish)

1952 births
Living people
20th-century engravers
21st-century engravers
Polish engravers
Polish stamp designers